Carbery's Hundred Isles are the islands along the coast of the Baronies of Carbery West and Carbery East, successors to the medieval Barony of Carbery, on the Celtic Sea, in the far south-west of Ireland. It is a term which includes those islands in and around Long Island Bay and Roaringwater Bay, County Cork.

Because of the Gulf Stream influence, the islands have a mild climate. However, most of them are exposed to the elements, so patches of lush vegetation contrast with treeless expanses of hill and bog, fringed with rocky cliffs and mixed shingle and sand beaches. The eastern islands within the estuary of the Ilen River are more sheltered and fertile.

The phrase "Carbery's Hundred Isles" is taken from the narrative poem The Sack of Baltimore by Thomas Davis, published in 1844, which tells of the raid on the village of Baltimore by Algerian pirates in 1631, in which most of the inhabitants were kidnapped and brought to the slave markets of Algiers. Setting the scene, the first line reads "The summer sun is falling soft on Carbery's hundred isles". This is an instance of poetic license, since there are no more than 50 islands in the archipelago. The popularity of the poem in the 19th century meant that the phrase passed into popular parlance, and subsequently into tourist-industry literature. The area was visited by writer Jonathan Swift in the 1720s, who described the islands and area in a poem.

Islands
The largest islands in the area include Cléire and Sherkin Island. Others include:
 Long Island
 Castle Island
 Carthy's Islands
 Horse Island, County Cork
 West Skeam Island
 East Skeam Island
 Heir Island
 Calves Island (Calf Island West, Calf Island Middle, Calf Island East)
 Spanish Island
 Ringarogy Island
 Goat Island (Beg/Mór)
 Rabbit island

See also
Clew Bay
List of islands of Ireland
Mizen Head

References

External links
 Sherkin Island
 West Cork Islands

Islands of County Cork